para-tert-Butylbenzoic acid (PTBBA) is an organic compound . A substituted benzoic acid, it is used in alkyd resins.

This compound is produced by oxidizing para-tert-butyltoluene with air.

References

Benzoic acids
Tert-butyl compounds
Alkyl-substituted benzenes